Russ Henshaw (born 7 June 1990) is an Australian freestyle skier. He won a silver medal in Slopestyle at the 2011 Winter X Games XV in Aspen, Colorado, behind Sammy Carlson. Russ represented Australia in slopestyle at the 2018 Winter Olympics in PyeongChang, where he finished 19th.

References

External links
 
 
 
 
 

1990 births
Living people
Australian male freestyle skiers
X Games athletes
Freestyle skiers at the 2014 Winter Olympics
Freestyle skiers at the 2018 Winter Olympics
Olympic freestyle skiers of Australia